The 2010 Massachusetts gubernatorial election was held on November 2, 2010. Incumbent Democratic Governor Deval Patrick was re-elected to a second term.

Party primaries were held on September 14, though all four candidates ran unopposed in their respective primaries. Tim Murray, who ran on a ticket with Patrick, was re-elected Lieutenant Governor. This election is the only gubernatorial election since 1994 in which the two major parties did not have a woman on the gubernatorial ticket.

Democratic primary

Governor

Candidates
Deval Patrick, incumbent Governor

Withdrew
Grace Ross, 2006 Green-Rainbow nominee for Governor

Polling

Lieutenant Governor

Candidates
Tim Murray, incumbent Lieutenant Governor

Republican primary

Governor

Candidates
Charlie Baker, member of the Weld and Cellucci administrations and CEO of Harvard Pilgrim Health Care

Eliminated at convention
Christy Mihos, independent candidate for governor in 2006

Declined
Kerry Healey, former Lieutenant Governor and 2006 nominee
 Bob Hedlund, State Senator
Joe Malone,  former State Treasurer  (running for MA-10)
Michael Sullivan, former U.S. Attorney for the District of Massachusetts

Polling

Lieutenant Governor

Candidates
 Richard Tisei, Minority Leader of the Massachusetts State Senate

General election

Candidates
Charlie Baker, CEO of Harvard Pilgrim Health Care (Republican)
Running mate: Richard Tisei, Minority Leader of the Massachusetts State Senate
Tim Cahill, State Treasurer and Receiver-General (Independent)
Running mate: Paul Loscocco, former Republican State Representative
Deval Patrick, incumbent Governor (Democratic)
Running mate: Tim Murray, incumbent Lieutenant Governor
Jill Stein, medical internist and co-chairperson of the Massachusetts Green-Rainbow Party (Green-Rainbow)
Running mate: Richard P. Purcell, surgery clerk and ergonomics assessor

Campaign

Defection of Loscocco
On October 1, 2010, Loscocco announced that he would withdraw from the race and endorse Republican candidate Charlie Baker.  Loscocco formally remained on the ballot, however. On October 7, Cahill filed a lawsuit against four former campaign aides, alleging that they conspired to undermine his candidacy and help Charlie Baker by arranging his defection. Cahill claimed that e-mails between Republican political consultants and Loscocco's top aide suggested that Loscocco may have been enticed to leave the ticket by future job promises. In response, Loscocco claimed that Cahill's top aide was coordinating strategy with the Patrick campaign and the Democratic Governors' Association and thus was never actually an independent effort.

Lottery ad

Soon after Cahill filed suit against him, Adam Meldrum, Cahill's former campaign manager, alleged that Cahill colluded with the Massachusetts Lottery, which is overseen by the state treasurer's office, to run an ad favorable to him during the campaign. The ad, paid for by the Commonwealth, described the Massachusetts Lottery "the most successful state lottery America" and "consistently well-managed", echoing themes from Cahill's gubernatorial campaign. Both Cahill and Massachusetts Lottery Director Mark Cavanagh denied the allegations. On October 18, e-mails released in conjunction with Cahill's lawsuit appeared to reveal that the campaign attempted to have the Lottery air a series of ads that praised the lottery's management. In the e-mails, Cahill's campaign media strategist Dane Strother told Meldrum to "Get the Lottery immediately cutting a spot and get it up...Needs to focus on the Lottery being the best in the country and above reproach." Two days later, Cahill's senior adviser Scott Campbell wrote, "I think the first thing is to figure out what/where/how we want to do this ... with Lottery people."

On April 2, 2012, Cahill was indicted by a Grand Jury on charges that he used $1.65 million in Massachusetts State Lottery advertising to aid his campaign for governor. On December 12, 2012, a mistrial was declared in the corruption case after the jury failed to reach a verdict on two counts of conspiracy.

Predictions

Polling

with Christy Mihos

with Grace Ross

Fundraising
As of October 31, 2010.  Shading indicates candidate with the highest amount.

Results

Results by county

See also
 2009–2010 Massachusetts legislature
2010 United States gubernatorial elections

References

External links
Massachusetts Secretary of the Commonwealth – Elections Division
Massachusetts Governor Candidates at Project Vote Smart
Campaign contributions for 2010 Massachusetts Governor from Follow the Money
Massachusetts Governor 2010 from OurCampaigns.com
  (graph of multiple polls)
Election 2010: Massachusetts Governor from Rasmussen Reports
2010 Massachusetts Governor Race from Real Clear Politics
2010 Massachusetts Governor's Race from CQ Politics
Race Profile in The New York Times

Debates

Campaign 
Charlie Baker for Governor
Tim Cahill for Governor
Deval Patrick for Governor
Jill Stein for Governor

Gubernatorial
2010
2010 United States gubernatorial elections